George W. Blunt,  completed in 1856, was a schooner built in New York that operated as a New York Sandy Hook pilot boat designated Pilot Boat No. 11. The schooner was used to pilot vessels to and from the Port of New York and New Jersey. A second schooner, also named George W. Blunt, was built in East Boston in 1861 and purchased to replace the first schooner as a pilot boat.

First George W. Blunt pilot boat

Construction and service

The original George W. Blunt was a two-masted, 85-foot long, 122-ton schooner, 20 tons larger than any other boat in the Sandy Hook fleet. The cabin was finished with bird's eye maple, mirrors, and velvet brocade cushions. The stern was ornamented with a scroll and shield which displayed the national flags of America, England and France.
According to American Lloyd's Register of American and Foreign Shipping, the George W. Blunt was built in New York, in 1856 for the New York Pilots. James Callahan was master of the boat.

As the original pilot-boat, the George W. Blunt, was in service with the N.Y. Pilots and rescued boats off the coast of New York. On October 10, 1860, New York Sandy Hook Pilot A. C. Malcom, of the pilot boat G. W. Blunt, No. 11, signed a statement along with other pilots, that they were satisfied with the representation of the New York Board of Commissioners of Pilots.

Civil War
On November 23, 1861, during the Civil War, the George W. Blunt was purchased by the United States Navy as a gunboat and dispatch boat in support of the Union Navy blockade of Confederate waterways. The schooner was renamed G. W. Blunt and commissioned 4 December 1861.

On April 19, 1862, the 60-ton Confederate schooner Wave under Captain Ryan, was captured by the pilot-boat George W. Blunt off the coast of South Carolina.

Second George W. Blunt pilot boat 
A replacement pilot boat, built in July 1861, was purchased from Boston builders Brown & Lovell to take the place of the original George W. Blunt, which was sold to the government during the Civil War. The 75-foot vessel (tonnage variously given as 120t and 52t, but types of measure unspecified) was purchased by Henderson & Callahan of New York for $8,000 was described as a fast sailer, and registered at New York to the New York Pilots with Official Number 10423.

In 1874, this George W. Blunt, rescued the bark Alfred at sea during a storm that brought the boat safely into New York port.

In February 1875, the pilot boat George W. Blunt sprang a leak off Gay Head and was run ashore at Jones Inlet, twenty-eight miles from Sandy Hook and was reported to have become a total loss. She had on board the following pilots: John Handran, Thomas Murphy, Robert Yates, Edward Kelly, James Heines, and Michael O'Shaughnessy. Her value was estimated at $10,000, which only $1,400 was covered by insurance.

See also
Pilot boat
List of Northeastern U. S. Pilot Boats

Footnotes

References

External links 
  

Schooners of the United States
Service vessels of the United States
1856 ships
1861 ships
Pilot boats
Ships of the Union Navy
Ships built in New York City
Maritime incidents in February 1875